LysM and putative peptidoglycan-binding domain-containing protein 3 is a protein that in humans is encoded by the LYSMD3 gene. This protein contains a LysM domain.

References

Further reading